Esteghlal Sari Football Club is an Iranian football club based in Sari, Iran. They currently compete in the 2011–12 Iran Football's 3rd Division.

Season-by-Season 
The table below shows the achievements of the club in various competitions.

See also 
 Hazfi Cup
 Iran Football's 2nd Division 2012–13

External links 
 Official website

Football clubs in Iran
Association football clubs established in 2008